The Times-Journal is a newspaper established in 1886, published in Condon in the U.S. state of Oregon.

History 
The publication is a consolidation of the Fossil Journal (1886), the Condon Globe (1891) and Times (1900). The most recent step in the consolidation (between the Journal and the Globe-Times) occurred in 1975.

The Journal was founded 14 years prior to the incorporation of Wheeler County, by Fossil's city attorney, H. H. Hendricks. The paper's second owner, James S. Stewart, was a leader in advocating for the formation of a new county, and for naming Fossil its seat. Until at least 1939, the Journal was the only newspaper in Fossil.

The Globe was Condon's first paper, launched in 1891 by Sloan P. Shutt. By 1909 it had become an independent Republican paper. In 1919 it was merged with the Times, which had been launched in 1900, and was a Republican paper from its inception.

As of 2018, the Times-Journal is owned by Macro Graphics of Condon, and its publishers are McLaren and Janet Stinchfield. McLaren Stinchfield, who serves as editor, got his start in the Condon news business in the mid 1970s. It is a member of the Oregon Newspaper Publishers Association, and reports a circulation of 1306 to 1443. The paper is published weekly on Thursdays.

References

External links 
 https://chroniclingamerica.loc.gov/lccn/sn96088380/

Gilliam County, Oregon
Newspapers published in Oregon
1886 establishments in Oregon
Publications established in 1886